White Stone is an unincorporated community in Spartanburg County, South Carolina, United States. White Stone has a post office with ZIP code 29386, which opened on February 2, 1827.

References

Unincorporated communities in Spartanburg County, South Carolina
Unincorporated communities in South Carolina